Gwillim is a surname. Notable people with the surname include:

 David Gwillim (born 1948), English actor
 Elizabeth Gwillim (bird artist) (1763–1807), English artist and naturalist
 Elizabeth Simcoe (1762–1850), née Elizabeth Posthuma Gwillim, English artist and diarist in colonial Canada
 Gareth Gwillim (born 1983), English professional footballer
 Henry Gwillim ( 1760–1837), British judge
 Jack Gwillim (1909–2001), English character actor
 Moore Gwillim (died 1611), Welsh politician
 Sarah-Jane Gwillim, British television and stage actress

See also
Bradford West Gwillimbury, Ontario, Canada
Castle Frank Brook, a buried creek in Toronto, Ontario, Canada named after Francis Gwillim
East Gwillimbury, Ontario, Canada
Gwillim Lake Provincial Park, British Columbia, Canada